Raymond Edward Busse (born September 25, 1948 in Daytona Beach, Florida) is a former Major League Baseball shortstop who played for the Houston Astros and St. Louis Cardinals in all or parts of three seasons spanning 1971–1974. He was traded along with Bobby Fenwick by the Astros to the Cardinals for Skip Jutze and Milt Ramírez on November 29, 1972.

Ray attended Mainland High School in Daytona Beach, Florida. He then attended Daytona Beach Community College and was signed as an undrafted free agent by the Houston Astros in 1967.

References

External links
, or Retrosheet
Pelota Binaria (Venezuelan Winter League)

1948 births
Living people
Baseball players from Florida
Cardenales de Lara players
American expatriate baseball players in Venezuela
Cocoa Astros players
Columbus Astros players
Covington Astros players
Daytona State Falcons baseball players
Denver Bears players
Florida Instructional League Astros players
Florida Instructional League Senators players
Houston Astros players
Iowa Oaks players
Major League Baseball shortstops
Oklahoma City 89ers players
Omaha Royals players
Peninsula Astros players
Sportspeople from Daytona Beach, Florida
St. Louis Cardinals players